The Arkansas–Texas A&M football rivalry is an American college football rivalry between the Arkansas Razorbacks and Texas A&M Aggies, which started in 1903. Between 1992 and 2008, the schools did not play each other when Arkansas left the Southwest Conference to join the Southeastern Conference. The rivalry was renewed as a neutral-site out-of-conference contest (and branded as The Southwest Classic) in 2009; in 2012 it once again became a conference rivalry when Texas A&M also joined the Southeastern Conference. Arkansas leads the series 42–34–3.

Series history
Arkansas and Texas A&M first played each other in 1903, and would play each other three times from 1903 to 1912, all as non-conference matchups.

Arkansas and Texas A&M would not meet on the field again until 1927, notwithstanding that both schools became charter members of the Southwest Conference twelve years earlier in 1915. The schools played annually from 1927 to 1930, but would not meet again until 1934. From 1934 to 1991, the two teams played annually as conference members. The annual matchup ceased in 1991 when Arkansas left the conference to join the Southeastern Conference.

On March 10, 2008, officials from both schools announced the series would recommence on October 3, 2009, under the name "Southwest Classic." The annual location for the game was announced as Cowboys Stadium (now called AT&T Stadium), located in Arlington. The attendance for the stadium was initially expected to be in the 80,000 range. Depending on ticket demand, temporary seating can be added to the stadium to increase the capacity up to 100,000 seats for the game. The tickets were said to be split 50/50 between the two schools. The initial agreement between the two schools allowed the game to be played for at least 10 years, followed by 5 consecutive, 4-year rollover options, allowing the game to potentially be played for a total of 30 consecutive seasons.

The rivalry once again became a conference matchup when Texas A&M joined the SEC on July 1, 2012, and became a member of the West Division of the conference alongside Arkansas. However, for Texas A&M's first two seasons in the SEC the series was played as a home-and-home series at the schools' campuses (Texas A&M hosted in 2012 and Arkansas hosted in 2013); the series resumed neutral-site play in AT&T Stadium for the 2014 season until at least 2024. Multiple athletic directors at Texas A&M have expressed a desire to move away from playing the game at AT&T Stadium, and on July 20, 2020, it was reported that the game would be played at Kyle Field due to precautions stemming from the COVID-19 pandemic, with a return trip potentially being played at Donald W. Reynolds Razorback Stadium in 2021. That return trip to Fayetteville did not happen, and the series resumed being played in Arlington in 2021.

After joining the SEC in 2012, A&M went on a 9-game winning streak, which was its longest in the series and first winning streak of more than 2 games in the series for the Aggies since 1938–1943. Arkansas broke the streak in 2021 and improved its record against A&M in Arlington to 4–6.

Game results

Notable games

1903 – First meeting 
Texas A&M 6 – Arkansas 0

In the first ever meeting, and only the 43rd game ever played by Arkansas and the 42nd ever played by Texas A&M, the Aggies won 6–0. The Aggies were coached by J. E. Platt and the Razorbacks were coached (in his only season as a head coach) by D. A. McDaniel.

1937 – First ranking in series 
Arkansas 26 – Texas A&M 13

After the introduction of the AP Poll in the 1936 season, the first ranking in the series came just the next year, with defending conference champions Arkansas being ranked No. 20 prior to the matchup. Arkansas won 26–13, in the two teams' second meeting in Fayetteville as conference foes.

1939 – Texas A&M's national championship year 
Texas A&M 27 – Arkansas 0

In 1939, after winning the game 27–0, the Aggies went on to an overall record of 11–0 and named the college football national champions in the Associated Press writers' poll for the 1939 college football season.

1964 – Arkansas's national championship year 
Arkansas 17 – Texas A&M 0

In 1964, after winning the game 17–0 in College Station, Texas, the Razorbacks went on to an overall record of 11–0 and won the college football national championship by beating Nebraska in the Cotton Bowl Classic. The Aggies were coached (in his final season) by Hank Foldberg, and Arkansas was coached by Hall of Fame coach Frank Broyles. This game marked the beginning of a streak of three straight scoreless games in the series for the Aggies.

1975 – First ranked matchup 
Arkansas 31 – Texas A&M 6

In 1975, Texas A&M was undefeated at 10-0 and ranked No. 2 in the nation coming into the regular season finale at No. 18 Arkansas. The game was played in Little Rock at War Memorial Stadium in front of a national audience, broadcast on ABC. If the Aggies won, they would clinch the Southwest Conference championship outright, and would have a chance to win a national championship in the 1976 Cotton Bowl Classic. But it wasn't to be, as the Razorbacks defeated Texas A&M 31–6, forcing a three-way tie for the SWC crown between Arkansas, Texas, and Texas A&M, sending the Razorbacks to the Cotton Bowl. Arkansas would beat Georgia in the Cotton Bowl Classic, 31–10, finishing the season 10–2 and ranked No. 7 in the AP poll. Meanwhile, the Aggies would stumble in a Liberty Bowl loss to USC, 20–0, and also finish the season with a 10–2 record and No. 11 ranking in the AP poll.

1980 
Arkansas 27 – Texas A&M 24

The 1980 contest won by Arkansas 27–24 was Texas A&M's 800th game ever played by the program. Arkansas was led by head coach Lou Holtz in his fourth year with the team, and went on to an overall record of 7–5 (3–5 in conference) for the season. The Aggies were led by Tom Wilson in his next to last season with the team, and finished the year 4–7 (3–5 in conference).

1986 
Arkansas 14 – Texas A&M 10

In 1986, the No. 7 Aggies were the defending Southwest Conference champions when they rolled into Little Rock to face No. 17 Arkansas in front of a sell out crowd at War Memorial Stadium. The Razorbacks would jump out to an early 7–0 lead, but Texas A&M would tie the game with a touchdown of their own, and the teams would be tied at halftime, 7–7, due to a missed A&M field goal. Arkansas would take back the lead in the 3rd quarter on a Greg Thomas touchdown run. The Razorback defense played great all game long, holding the Aggies to a field goal in the second half. On fourth down from inside the Arkansas fifteen yard line, Arkansas's defense tipped away an Aggie pass into the end zone in the closing seconds of the game, securing the victory for the Razorbacks. Both teams would finish the season 9–3 after bowl losses.

1991 – Arkansas's last game in the Southwest Conference 
Texas A&M 13 – Arkansas 3

In the last Southwest Conference meeting on November 16, 1991, at Kyle Field, Texas A&M won 13–3 in a game nationally televised by ESPN. The Razorbacks came out in the wishbone formation on offense, but the Aggie defense held the Hogs to only 121 yards of total offense. After the season, the Razorbacks went on to leave the Southwest Conference, and join the Southeastern Conference, thereby ending the yearly in-conference game with the Aggies.

2009 – Renewal 
Arkansas 47 – Texas A&M 19

On October 3, 2009, the two teams met for the first time since 1991. The rivalry was originally slated to take place on a yearly basis at the new Cowboys Stadium in Arlington, Texas. Arkansas came back from a 10–0 deficit in the first quarter to win 47–19.

2011 – "Welcome to the SEC" 
Arkansas 42 – Texas A&M 38

The Aggies, leading 35–17 at the half, blew their 18-point lead and only scored 3 points in the second half. As Broderick Green charged into the end zone on the final score of the game, Arkansas fans appeared on the Cowboys Stadium video holding a sign saying "Welcome to the SEC" (in recognition of A&M's announcement only six days earlier that it would join Arkansas as a member of the SEC in 2012). Since the "Welcome to the SEC" game, the Aggies have won 10 of the 11 games played as conference games.

2012 – First all-SEC game 

Texas A&M 58 – Arkansas 10

On September 29, 2012, the Aggies and Razorbacks met on the gridiron as conference rivals for the first time since 1991, with A&M joining Arkansas in the Southeastern Conference. The Aggies won 58–10, which is the largest margin of victory in the series. The game moved from the neutral-site Cowboys Stadium venue of the last three years to Kyle Field as part of a planned home-and-home series with Arkansas for A&M's first two SEC seasons; the 2014 matchup returned to AT&T Stadium.

2014, '15 & '17 – 3 OT games in 4 years 

The 2014 contest returned to AT&T Stadium (home of the Dallas Cowboys) after a two-year "home-and-home" schedule the previous two seasons. Both the 2014 and 2015 contests went into overtime. These back-to-back years of overtime were also the first two overtimes between the two schools in the rivalry's history, after overtime was adopted by the NCAA for all games beginning with the bowl games following the 1995 regular season. The 2017 matchup also ended in overtime, with the two teams combining for a series record 93 points. Texas A&M won all three of these overtime matches.

See also  
 List of NCAA college football rivalry games

References

College football rivalries in the United States
Arkansas Razorbacks football
Texas A&M Aggies football
American football in the Dallas–Fort Worth metroplex